"Did You Fall in Love with Me" is a song recorded by Canadian country music group Prairie Oyster. It was released in 1991 as the first single from their third studio album, Everybody Knows. It peaked at number 7 on the RPM Country Tracks chart in December 1991.

Chart performance

Year-end charts

References

1991 singles
Prairie Oyster songs
RCA Records singles
Song recordings produced by Josh Leo
1991 songs
Songs written by Joan Besen
Canadian Country Music Association Song of the Year songs